Bakos and in Slovak the accented Bakoš are surnames. 

Bakos and Bakoš may refer to:

Places
Bakos, Alexandria, a neighborhood in Alexandria, Egypt.

People

Bakos
Georgios Bakos (1892–1945), Greek Army officer
György Bakos (born 1960), Hungarian hurdler
Jenő Bakos (1929–1959), Hungarian middle-distance runner
Jozef Bakos (1891–1977), American painter of Polish descent
Károly Bakos (born 1943), Hungarian weightlifter
Michael Bakos (born 1979), German ice hockey player
Mihály Bakos, also known in Slovene as Miháo Bakoš or Mihael Bakoš, (c. 1742–1803), Hungarian Slovene Lutheran priest, author, and educator
Nada Bakos, American former Central Intelligence Agency (CIA) analyst and targeting officer 
Pál Bakos (born 1932), Hungarian rower
Szabolcs Bakos (born 1987), Hungarian footballer
Yannis Bakos, American professor of business

Bakoš
Juraj Bakoš (born 1960), Slovak ice hockey player
Marek Bakoš (born 1983), Slovak footballer
Martin Bakoš (born 1990), Slovak ice hockey player

See also
Bakossi (disambiguation)